Kantorowice may refer to the following places in Poland:
Kantorowice, Opole Voivodeship
Kantorowice, part of the Wzgórza Krzesławickie district of Kraków